Pasco High School is a high school in Dade City, Florida, United States. Kari Kadlub is the current principal, and Catalina Fernandez, Eshonda Swackard, Allison Taylor, and Aaron Melvin serve as assistant principals.

History
Pasco High School originated from the earliest school in Dade City, and is the first high school in Pasco County.  This first school in Dade City held classes at the Baptist Church in the town.  According to a speech delivered in 1921 by a local historian, the second location for the school was a second floor room above a storefront, just south of a cigar factory.  After that, a local Masonic Temple was used for classes.  Finally, circa 1899, the first purpose-built building for the school was erected on land donated by the S. A. L. Railroad.  It was in this building that the high school held classes, having been founded about ten years earlier in 1889.

The first building was supplemented by a wooden annex in 1905, then by a large two-story annex in 1908.  Also in 1908, the Gainesville Daily Sun reported that a normal school, the South Florida Normal Institute, had been established in the same location.  The report stated, "The South Florida Normal Institute, Dade City, has reached an enrollment of 322. The school board has contracted with Prof. P. W. Corr, as principal, for the next five years, and it will meet next Friday to open bids and let contract for a large annex to the present building. No school in the State is doing better work or making more rapid growth than the South Florida Normal Institute. The cornerstone of the new building will be laid with Masonic honors."

In 1947, the St. Petersburg Times reported that the local school district was reorganized.  Stated the report, "A recently reorganized school district consisting of the smaller districts of Pasadena, Pasco Station, and Blanton in a recent referendum voted a bond issue of $400,000 to finance the erection of a new Pasco High school and to enlarge the grammar school within Dade City."  This new school, the third building housing Pasco High, opened in 1949, and held classes until 1970.  The 1949 building was then used for Pasco Middle School and was demolished in 2010.  The present high school opened in 1970.

Notable alumni
 The Bellamy Brothers, David and Howard
 Domonic Brown, outfielder for the Philadelphia Phillies
 Jim Courier, tennis pro
 Darren Hambrick
 Troy Hambrick
 Josh Johnson, cornerback
 Gene Nelson, former MLB player (New York Yankees, Seattle Mariners, Chicago White Sox, Oakland Athletics, California Angels, Texas Rangers
 Joey Ivie, NFL player for the Tennessee Titans
 Janarion Grant, gridiron football return specialist for the Winnipeg Blue Bombers

References

External links
Pasco High School

Educational institutions established in 1889
High schools in Pasco County, Florida
Public high schools in Florida
Dade City, Florida
1889 establishments in Florida